409th may refer to:


Soviet Union
409th Rifle Division, 1941–1945

United Kingdom
409th Coast Regiment, Royal Artillery or 1st Cornwall (Duke of Cornwall's) Artillery Volunteers
409th (Suffolk) Heavy Anti-Aircraft Battery, Royal Artillery or 1st Suffolk Artillery Volunteer Corps

United States
409th Air Expeditionary Operations Group, provisional United States Air Force unit assigned to Air Mobility Command
409th Bombardment Squadron or 909th Air Refueling Squadron (909 ARS), part of the 18th Wing at Kadena Air Base, Japan
409th Fighter Squadron or 194th Fighter Squadron, aviation unit of the California Air National Guard
409th Support Brigade (United States), support brigade of the United States Army
409th Bomb Squadron, 93rd Bomb Group, 8th Air Force, United States Army Air Force, B-24 Liberators, Flying Pandas, Hardwick, England, World War II European Theater

See also
409 (number)
409, the year 409 (CDIX) of the Julian calendar
409 BC